Swan View Senior High School is an independent public co-educational high day school, located in Swan View, Western Australia. The school is located within the North Metropolitan Education Region school district, a district of the WA Department of Education.

Established in 1977, the school provides education for approximately 580 students from Year 7 to Year 12.

See also

 List of schools in the Perth metropolitan area

References

External links
Swan View Senior High School

Public high schools in Perth, Western Australia
1977 establishments in Australia
Educational institutions established in 1977